Robert Mercer (21 September 1889 – 23 April 1926) was a Scottish footballer who played for Leith Athletic, Heart of Midlothian, Dunfermline Athletic and Scotland. Mercer served in the British armed forces during the First World War, but he was a victim of a gas attack and did not fully recover.

References

External links

London Hearts profile (Hearts)
London Hearts profile (Scotland)
London Hearts profile (Scottish League)

1889 births
1926 deaths
Scottish footballers
Scotland international footballers
Leith Athletic F.C. players
Heart of Midlothian F.C. players
Dunfermline Athletic F.C. players
Scottish Football League players
Scottish Football League representative players
British Army personnel of World War I
Association football central defenders
Selkirk F.C. players
Footballers from Falkirk (council area)
Sportspeople from the Scottish Borders